Ricky Spargo (born 21 August 1947) is a former Australian rules footballer who played with Footscray in the Victorian Football League (VFL). 

Like his father Bob senior who had run third in both the 1936 and 1940 Stawell Gift finals, Ricky was also a well performed professional runner, finishing fifth in the 1974 Stawell Gift final.

Notes 

Watt, Gary (2008). Stawell Gift Almanac 1st ed. Legacy Books. Page 217.

External links 

http://trove.nla.gov.au/newspaper/article/110773145?searchTerm=1974%20Stawell%20Gift&searchLimits=

Living people
1947 births
Australian rules footballers from Victoria (Australia)
Western Bulldogs players